Fuck Me I'm Rich was a grunge compilation album released by Waterfront Records in 1990. Each of the songs are available on each artists respective albums. The album includes ten songs, two by each of the five artists. The title of the album is a play on the words of the Mudhoney song "Touch Me I'm Sick," which is featured on the album.

Track listing
Mudhoney - "Touch Me I'm Sick"
Tad - "Ritual Device"
Blood Circus - "Two Way Street"
Swallow - "Trapped"
Soundgarden - "Hunted Down"
Mudhoney - "In 'N' Out Of Grace"
Tad - "Daisy"
Blood Circus - "Six Foot Under"
Swallow - "Guts"
Soundgarden - "Nothing To Say"

The two Mudhoney songs are from Superfuzz Bigmuff. The two Soundgarden songs are from Screaming Life and the two Blood Circus songs are from Primal Rock Therapy.

References

Record label compilation albums
Grunge compilation albums
1994 compilation albums
Sub Pop compilation albums